Opha May Johnson (née Jacob, May 4, 1878 – August 11, 1955) was the first woman known to have enlisted in the United States Marine Corps. She joined the Marine Corps Reserve on August 13, 1918, officially becoming the first female Marine.

Early years
Opha May Jacob was born on May 4, 1878, in Kokomo, Indiana. She graduated from the shorthand and typewriting department of Wood's Commercial College in Washington, D.C., in 1895. As salutatorian of her class, she "entertained the audience with a carefully prepared paper." Jacob married Victor Hugo Johnson (1873–1950) on December 20, 1898, at the Sixth Presbyterian Church in Washington, D.C. At the time of their marriage, Victor Johnson was the musical director at the Lafayette Square Opera House. Prior to joining the Marines, Johnson was in the Civil Service, working for the Interstate Commerce Commission.

Military service

Johnson became the first known woman to enlist in the Marine Corps on August 13, 1918, when she joined the Marine Corps Reserve during World War I. Johnson, due to being first in line that day, was the first of over 300 women to enlist in the Marine Corps Reserve during World War I. She was 39 years old at enlistment.

According to 1918 newspaper articles, as well as the published history of Women Marines in World War I, Johnson's first duties were as a clerk at Headquarters Marine Corps, managing the records of other female reservists who joined after she did. She was promoted to sergeant in September, and was the highest-ranking woman in the Marine Corps during her time in service.

On July 11, 1919, the American Legion granted a charter to the first post of women's Marine Corps reservists. Known as Belleau Wood Post No. 1, its membership consisted of 90 women who had worked at Headquarters Marine Corps. Johnson was a charter member of this post.

At the end of World War I the Marine Corps, like all services, began the steady disenrollment of women, including Johnson, from active service. After her brief military career, she became a clerk in the War Department, and worked for the Marine Corps as a civil servant until retiring in 1943.

Common biographical errors
Marine Corps historians have pointed out that errors concerning Johnson have been circulated and published, the first of which concerns her middle name. Although many have identified the spelling of her middle name as Mae, Johnson spelled her middle name May on her enlistment form.

The second fallacy typically published is her age when she enlisted. Although many report her birth year as 1900, placing her in her late teens at the time of her enlistment, she is known to have been 39 at enlistment.

A third error involves her official photograph.  Another well known photograph of three female Marine PFCs (Mary Kelly, May O'Keefe, and Ruth Spike) in 1918, was cropped to show just the center figure and published correctly as being May O'Keefe.  At a later date, that cropped picture was erroneously attributed as being Johnson and subsequently used by otherwise reliable sources.

Death and burial
Johnson died on August 11, 1955, at Mount Alto Veterans Hospital in Washington, D.C.  Services were held at Warner E. Pumphrey Funeral Home on Saturday, August 13, 1955, 37 years to the day from when she stood first in the line of women answering the call to become a U.S. Marine. Buried near her husband and parents in Rock Creek Cemetery, her grave was unmarked. In late 2017 the Women Marines Association began raising funds to place a marker at her burial site. On August 29, 2018, she received a grave marker which celebrated 100 years of women in the marines.

Commemoration

In late 2017 the Women Marines Association began raising funds to place a marker at Johnson’s burial site. On August 29, 2018, she received a grave marker which celebrated 100 years of women in the marines.

The Marine training center at Grissom Air Reserve Base was renamed the Sergeant Opha May Johnson Marine Reserve Center on November 10, 2022, which was the 247th anniversary of the founding of the Marine Corps. The next day, a monument honoring Johnson was unveiled in Kokomo, Indiana.

References

1878 births
1955 deaths
People from Kokomo, Indiana
United States Marine Corps personnel of World War I
American women in World War I
United States Marine Corps reservists
Female United States Marine Corps personnel
United States Marine Corps non-commissioned officers
Military personnel from Indiana